Kalaya Sophonpanich (born 21 September 1940) is a Thai physicist and politician who served as the Minister of Science and Technology from 2008 to 2010.

Early life and education
Kalaya is the daughter-in-law of Chin Sophonpanich and the wife of Chote Sophonpanich. She graduated with a Bachelor of Science (Honors) from the Faculty of Science, Chulalongkorn University in 1961 and received a Colombo scholarship to study for a master's degree and receiving scholarships at the doctoral level Nuclear Physics at Imperial College, London and earned a Ph.D. in High Energy Nuclear Physics in 1970.

Careers
She was a co-founder of the National Electronics and Computer Technology Center (NECTEC) in 1986. Then she was the founder and president of the Prapakarnpanya Foundation for helping Mentally Retarded People of Thailand under royal patronage. Kalaya is more widely known when applying for the Governor of Bangkok in 2000 as an independent candidate, getting number 4 even though not elected but has gained popularity with the people of Bangkok. Later she became a member of Democrat Party who applied to be a member of the House of Representatives in the elections of 2001 and 2005. Subsequently, she was appointed the Minister of Science and Technology in the government of Abhisit Vejjajiva. After the cabinet reshuffle in June 2010 was made, she was fired from the position of minister.

References

Living people
1940 births
Kalaya Sophonpanich
Kalaya Sophonpanich
Kalaya Sophonpanich
Kalaya Sophonpanich
Kalaya Sophonpanich
Kalaya Sophonpanich
Kalaya Sophonpanich
Kalaya Sophonpanich
Kalaya Sophonpanich
Kalaya Sophonpanich
Kalaya Sophonpanich
Kalaya Sophonpanich
Kalaya Sophonpanich